Ambloma klimeschi is a moth of the Symmocidae family. It is found on the Canary Islands.

References

Moths described in 1975
Symmocinae
Moths of Africa